The 1991 New Brunswick general election was held on September 23, 1991, to elect 58 members to the 52nd New Brunswick Legislative Assembly, the governing house of the province of New Brunswick, Canada.

As expected, the Liberal Party won a large majority.  Many were surprised that the Confederation of Regions Party formed the official opposition.  Though they ran even with the PCs in popular vote, their concentration of support in rural anglophone ridings gave them considerably more seats.  Weir's personal popularity and name recognition was not enough to give her party more seats as she, and the Tories, had votes relatively evenly spread around the province.

Background
Though Frank McKenna's Liberals were expected to win a second term after sweeping all 58 seats in 1987, any of the other three parties were considered contenders for official opposition.

The New Democratic Party was led by Elizabeth Weir, who had been the strongest and most consistent voice of opposition to the Liberals since her election as party leader in 1988.  In the ensuing three years, thanks to the lack of opposition members in the legislature (MLAs), her firebrand style had made her a well-known name in New Brunswick politics.

The fledgling Confederation of Regions Party had been created out of the ashes of the Hatfield Tories when the latter went from majority government to zero seats in 1987.  CoR was running numerous former Tory MLAs and candidates, and even some former Tory cabinet ministers.  Its base of support was in English-speaking regions of New Brunswick, where many conservatives had become alienated by Hatfield's close relationship with Acadians.

The Progressive Conservatives had been in power for the majority of years since confederation, and 17 straight years before 1987.  Even so, the scandals of the final Hatfield years and the growing unpopularity of the federal Progressive Conservatives hindered their success.  Additionally they had perceived internal problems having gone through four leaders since the last election: Hatfield, then two-year interim leader Malcolm MacLeod then Barbara Baird, and then Dennis Cochrane.

Close results
A number of races were close 2 or 3 way contests with only a small fraction of votes separating the winner from the losers.  The tables below highlight the seats that the three major parties missed by less than 10 percentage points (pp) and the margins between them and the winner.

Results

Results by party

|- style="background-color:#CCCCCC"
!rowspan="2" colspan="2"|Party
!rowspan="2"|Party leader
!rowspan="2"|# ofcandidates
!colspan="4"|Seats
!colspan="3"|Popular vote
|- style="background-color:#CCCCCC"
| style="text-align:center;" |1987
| style="text-align:center;font-size:75%;"|Dissolution
| style="text-align:center;" |Elected
| style="text-align:center;" |% Change
| style="text-align:center;" |#
| style="text-align:center;" |%
| style="text-align:center;" |Change

| style="text-align:left;" |Frank McKenna
| style="text-align:right;" |58
| style="text-align:right;" |58
| style="text-align:right;" |58
| style="text-align:right;" |46
| style="text-align:right;" |-20.7%
| style="text-align:right;" |193,890
| style="text-align:right;" |47.11%
| style="text-align:right;" |-13.28%

| style="text-align:left;" |Arch Pafford
| style="text-align:right;" |48
| style="text-align:right;" |-
| style="text-align:right;" |0
| style="text-align:right;" |8
| style="text-align:right;" |-
| style="text-align:right;" |87,256
| style="text-align:right;" |21.18%
| style="text-align:right;" |-

| style="text-align:left;" |Dennis Cochrane
| style="text-align:right;" |58
| style="text-align:right;" |0
| style="text-align:right;" |0
| style="text-align:right;" |3
| style="text-align:right;" |-
| style="text-align:right;" |85,210
| style="text-align:right;" |20.69%
| style="text-align:right;" |-7.89%

| style="text-align:left;" |Elizabeth Weir
| style="text-align:right;" |58
| style="text-align:right;" |0
| style="text-align:right;" |0
| style="text-align:right;" |1
| style="text-align:right;" |-
| style="text-align:right;" |44,384
| style="text-align:right;" |10.78%
| style="text-align:right;" |+0.23%

| style="text-align:right;" |
| style="text-align:right;" |2
| style="text-align:right;" |-
| style="text-align:right;" |-
| style="text-align:right;" |-
| style="text-align:right;" | 
| style="text-align:right;" |850
| style="text-align:right;" |0.21%
| style="text-align:right;" |-0.26%
|-
| style="text-align:left;" colspan="3" |Total
| style="text-align:right;" |224
| style="text-align:right;" |58
| style="text-align:right;" |58
| style="text-align:right;" |58
| style="text-align:right;" |-
| style="text-align:right;" |411,590
|colspan="2"|100%
|-
| style="text-align:left;" colspan="11" |Source: http://www.gnb.ca/elections
|-
|}

Results by region

Results by riding

Legend
bold denotes party leader
† denotes an incumbent who is not running for re-election

North 
Consisting of Victoria, Madawaska, Restigouche and Gloucester county ridings.

|-
|bgcolor=whitesmoke|Victoria-Tobique
||
|Larry R. Kennedy 2,854
|
|Carl Skaarup 1,580
|
|Neville J. Crabbe 1,664
|
|Cheryl Ann Elizabeth Pelkey 308
|
|
||
|Larry Kennedy
|-
|bgcolor=whitesmoke|Grand Falls
||
|Paul Duffie 3,617
|
|Roy Simon Dee 197
|
|Léo R. Thériault 1,209
|
|Clyde Winchester 207
|
|
||
|Paul Duffie
|-
|bgcolor=whitesmoke|Madawaska-les-Lacs
||
|Georges Corriveau 2,906
|
|
|
|Raout Cyr 2,211
|
|Gérard Caron 601
|
|
||
|Georges Corriveau
|-
|bgcolor=whitesmoke|Madawaska Centre
||
|Gérald Clavette 2,942
|
|
|
|Don Marmen 1,706
|
|Jean-Marie St-Onge 412
|
|
||
|Gérald Clavette
|-
|bgcolor=whitesmoke|Edmundston
||
|Roland Beaulieu 3,686
|
|
|
|Patrick Dalpé 1,156
|
|Réal Couturier 719
|
|
||
|Roland Beaulieu
|-
|bgcolor=whitesmoke|Madawaska South
||
|Pierrette Ringuette 2,843
|
|
|
|Théo Poitras 1,715
|
|Julien Tardif 209
|
|
||
|Pierrette Ringuette
|-
|bgcolor=whitesmoke|Restigouche West
||
|Jean Paul Savoie 3,922
|
|Robert A. Boudreau 517
|
|Félix J. Dubé 2,524
|
|Rino Pelletier 302
|
|
||
|Jean Paul Savoie
|-
|bgcolor=whitesmoke|Campbellton
||
|Edmond Blanchard 3,599
|
|Ronald Rioux 1,062
|
|Bill Ferguson 934
|
|Douglas Gordon Kingston 593
|
|
||
|Edmond Blanchard
|-
|bgcolor=whitesmoke|Dalhousie
||
|Allan Maher 2,804
|
|Isabelle Ann Culverwell Davis 451
|
|Scott Chedore 608
|
|Aurele Ferlotte 1,927
|
|
||
|Allan Maher
|-
|bgcolor=whitesmoke|Restigouche East
||
|Rayburn Doucett 3,023
|
|Norman Shea 381
|
|Richard Lapointe 294
|
|Walter Gauthier, Jr. 1,241
|
|
||
|Rayburn Doucett
|-
|bgcolor=whitesmoke|Nigadoo-Chaleur
||
|Albert Doucet 4,732
|
|
|
|David Boudreau 466
|
|Raoul Charest 1,696
|
|Ulric DeGrace (Ind.) 714
||
|Albert Doucet
|-
|bgcolor=whitesmoke|Nepisiguit-Chaleur
||
|Frank Branch 3,752
|
|Laurie Alan Daley 760
|
|Robert Hornibrook 616
|
|Karen Ann McCrea 1,172
|
|
||
|Frank Branch
|-
|bgcolor=whitesmoke|Bathurst
||
|Marcelle Mersereau 4,047
|
|Laurie Joseph Robichaud 1,280
|
|Claire Wilt 1,025
|
|Colette Buttimer 832
|
|
||
|Paul Kenny†
|-
|bgcolor=whitesmoke|Caraquet
||
|Bernard Thériault 5,298
|
|
|
|Gilbert Godin 2,279
|
|Roger Duguay 2,167
|
|
||
|Bernard Thériault
|-
|bgcolor=whitesmoke|Shippagan-les-Îles
|
|Aldéa Landry 4,831
|
|
||
|Jean Gauvin 4,881
|
|John Gagnon 128
|
|
||
|Aldéa Landry
|-
|bgcolor=whitesmoke|Tracadie
||
|Denis Losier 6,374
|
|
|
|Colette McGraw 2,103
|
|Pierre Cousineau 1,427
|
|
||
|Denis Losier
|}

Central 
Consisting of Carleton, York, Sunbury and Northumberland county ridings.

|-
|bgcolor=whitesmoke|Carleton North
||
|Fred Harvey 2,163
|
|Jack Salmon 857
|
|Dale Graham 2,032
|
|Anna Marie Kilfoil 84
|
|
||
|Fred Harvey
|-
|bgcolor=whitesmoke|Carleton Centre
||
|Allison DeLong 2,087
|
|Lois M. Clark 1,281
|
|Mary Hatfield 1,387
|
|Linda Marie Lawrence 104
|
|
||
|Allison DeLong
|-
|bgcolor=whitesmoke|Carleton South
||
|Bruce Smith 2,462
|
|Jerry Covey 2,036
|
|Bill Hamilton 890
|
|Arthur L. Slipp 254
|
|
||
|Bruce Smith
|-
|bgcolor=whitesmoke|York North
|
|Bob Simpson 3,825
||
|Gregory James Hargrove 5,463
|
|Mark A. Moir 1,174
|
|Chris Orenstein 450
|
|
||
|Bob Simpson
|-
|bgcolor=whitesmoke|York South
|
|Al Lacey 4,754
||
|Danny Cameron 5,607
|
|Marven Grant 1,797
|
|Rita Hurley 602
|
|
||
|Al Lacey
|-
|bgcolor=whitesmoke|Fredericton South
||
|Russ King 4,584
|
|Meryl Sarty 3,295
|
|Jamie Henderson 2,575
|
|Pauline MacKenzie 1,463
|
|Henry John Marshall (Ind.) 136
||
|Russ King
|-
|bgcolor=whitesmoke|Fredericton North
|
|Jim Wilson 3,864
||
|Ed Allen 6,052
|
|Donald H. Parent 1,810
|
|Richard Stephen DeSaulniers 553
|
|
||
|Jim Wilson
|-
|bgcolor=whitesmoke|Sunbury
|
|Shawn Perry 2,616
||
|Max White 3,935
|
|Keith Ashfield 799
|
|Barbara Ann Fairley 306
|
|
||
|Doug Harrison†
|-
|bgcolor=whitesmoke|Oromocto
|
|Tom Gilbert 2,036
||
|Albert Rector 2,197
|
|Joe Mombourquette 939
|
|Alton Shears 297
|
|
||
|Tom Gilbert
|-
|bgcolor=whitesmoke|Southwest Miramichi
|
|Claude Stewart 2,798
||
|Brent Taylor 2,954
|
|Donald Long 701
|
|Larry Lynch 193
|
|
||
|Morris Green†
|-
|bgcolor=whitesmoke|Miramichi-Newcastle
||
|John McKay 2,583
|
|Arch Pafford 2,252
|
|Paul Dawson 2,573
|
|Liane Tiboudeau-Doucet 315
|
|
||
|John McKay
|-
|bgcolor=whitesmoke|Chatham
||
|Frank McKenna 3,147
|
|Jim West 1,563
|
|Richard Hilchey 598
|
|Wera Baldwin 383
|
|
||
|Frank McKenna
|-
|bgcolor=whitesmoke|Bay du Vin
||
|Reg MacDonald 2,834
|
|John J. Keating 604
|
|Muriel Lamkey 1,608
|
|Jeanne Thériault 220
|
|
||
|Reg MacDonald
|-
|bgcolor=whitesmoke|Miramichi Bay
||
|Danny Gay 3,940
|
|James Grant MacIntosh 638
|
|Emilien LeBreton 2,117
|
|Norman A. Richardson 493
|
|
||
|Danny Gay
|}

South West 
Consisting of Queens, Kings, Saint John and Charlotte county ridings.

|-
|bgcolor=whitesmoke|Queens North
||
|Doug Tyler 1,740
|
|Constance Melissa Webber 1,654
|
|Clayton Chase 256
|
|Susan Barton 94
|
|
||
|Doug Tyler
|-
|bgcolor=whitesmoke|Queens South
||
|Vaughn Blaney 1,543
|
|Jarvis M. Ducey 1,205
|
|Larry C. Black 676
|
|Gordon Black 255
|
|
||
|Vaughn Blaney
|-
|bgcolor=whitesmoke|Kings West
||
|Laureen Jarrett 6,219
|
|Glendon F. Jones 3,810
|
|Nancy E. Grant 3,267
|
|Roger M. Olmstead 1,494
|
|
||
|Laureen Jarrett
|-
|bgcolor=whitesmoke|Kings Centre
||
|Georgie Day 3,011
|
|Colby Fraser 2,882
|
|Charles Edward Murray 2,371
|
|Marian Jefferies 1,133
|
|
||
|Kal Seaman†
|-
|bgcolor=whitesmoke|Kings East
|
|Tim Wilson 2,843
|
|Mel Stockford 2,098
||
|Hazen Myers 2,871
|
|Anne-Marie Dupuis 617
|
|
||
|Pete Dalton†
|-
|bgcolor=whitesmoke|Saint John Fundy
||
|Stuart Jamieson 2,213
|
|Gary William Vincent 1,868
|
|Bev Harrison 2,033
|
|Kathleen Fudge 907
|
|
||
|Stuart Jamieson
|-
|bgcolor=whitesmoke|East Saint John
||
|George J. Jenkins 2,785
|
|Gary Ewart 2,650
|
|Don Elliott 1,360
|
|Ben Donaldson 1,868
|
|
||
|Peter Trites†
|-
|bgcolor=whitesmoke|Saint John Harbour
||
|Louis Murphy 1,779
|
|Marie Gerrior 844
|
|Nargis Kheraj 496
|
|Al Maund 968
|
|
||
|Louis Murphy
|-
|bgcolor=whitesmoke|Saint John South
|
|John Mooney 1,596
|
|Ray McDevitt 549
|
|Paddy Addison 514
||
|Elizabeth Weir 1,675
|
|
||
|John Mooney
|-
|bgcolor=whitesmoke|Saint John Park
||
|Shirley Dysart 1,743
|
|Richard Condon Sullivan Kinsella 825
|
|Shirley McAlary 733
|
|Judith Meinert 777
|
|
||
|Shirley Dysart
|-
|bgcolor=whitesmoke|Saint John North
||
|Leo McAdam 1,892
|
|Peter A. Whitebone 950
|
|Doug Shippee 1,089
|
|Julie Galbraith 966
|
|
||
|Leo McAdam
|-
|bgcolor=whitesmoke|Saint John West
||
|Jane Barry 3,527
|
|Jim Webb 2,471
|
|Gerry Maher 1,559
|
|Robert W. Hickes 1,382
|
|
||
|Jane Barry
|-
|bgcolor=whitesmoke|Charlotte-Fundy
||
|Eric Allaby 1,950
|
|Keith B. Guptilt 957
|
|Sharon Tucker 757
|
|Dorothy Matthews 183
|
|
||
|Eric Allaby
|-
|bgcolor=whitesmoke|Charlotte Centre
||
|Sheldon Lee 2,195
|
|Connie M. Stewart 516
|
|Stanley John Smith 471
|
|Jean Stewart 162
|
|
||
|Sheldon Lee
|-
|bgcolor=whitesmoke|Charlotte West
||
|Reid Hurley 1,796
|
|Mabel Groom 768
|
|Bev Lawrence 1,077
|
|Ellen Smith 281
|
|
||
|Reid Hurley
|-
|bgcolor=whitesmoke|St. Stephen-Milltown
||
|Ann Breault 1,820
|
|Robert Michael Booth 798
|
|Ken Stevens 1,129
|
|Irene Tobin 114
|
|
||
|Ann Breault
|}

South East 
Consisting of Kent, Westmorland and Albert county ridings.

|-
|bgcolor=whitesmoke|Kent North
||
|Conrad Landry 3,377
|
|
|
|Dominique Babineau 939
|
|Docile Doiron 1,011
|
|
||
|Conrad Landry
|-
|bgcolor=whitesmoke|Kent Centre
||
|Alan Graham 3,025
|
|Percy Beers 626
|
|David MacDonald 347
|
|Neil Gardner 379
|
|
||
|Alan Graham
|-
|bgcolor=whitesmoke|Kent South
||
|Camille Thériault 5,573
|
|
|
|Jean-Claude Cormier 2,023
|
|Gérald Mazerolle 1,256
|
|
||
|Camille Thériault
|-
|bgcolor=whitesmoke|Shediac
||
|Bernard Richard 7,298
|
|Lester Russell Hyslop 481
|
|Emile Goguen Dupré 1,240
|
|Patrick Allain 830
|
|
||
|Azor LeBlanc†
|-
|bgcolor=whitesmoke|Tantramar
||
|Marilyn Trenholme 3,008
|
|Clarke Edgar Sheppard 1,091
|
|William R. Campbell 556
|
|Robert Hall 1,419
|
|
||
|Marilyn Trenholme
|-
|bgcolor=whitesmoke|Memramcook
||
|Greg O'Donnell 6,393
|
|Julia Elnora LeBlanc 407
|
|Jean-Robert Gaudet 680
|
|Martin Aubin 1,797
|
|
||
|Greg O'Donnell
|-
|bgcolor=whitesmoke|Moncton East
||
|J. Raymond Frenette 4,041
|
|William André Joseph LeSage 1,120
|
|John Hansen 1,026
|
|Mary Elizabeth McLaughlin 1,416
|
|
||
|Ray Frenette
|-
|bgcolor=whitesmoke|Moncton North
||
|Mike McKee 4,797
|
|Tom Taylor 1,780
|
|John MacFarlane 1,262
|
|J.C. Bourque 973
|
|
||
|Mike McKee
|-
|bgcolor=whitesmoke|Moncton West
||
|Jim Lockyer 3,558
|
|Arthur M. Hayden 1,691
|
|Ben D. Stymiest 1,483
|
|Stephanie Day Domingue 726
|
|
||
|Jim Lockyer
|-
|bgcolor=whitesmoke|Petitcodiac
|
|Hollis S. Steeves 4,698
|
|Leona May Geldart 4,786
||
|Dennis Cochrane 4,879
|
|Richard Hay 1,204
|
|
||
|Hollis Steeves
|-
|bgcolor=whitesmoke|Riverview
|
|Hubert Seamans 3,115
||
|Gordon B. Wilden 3,139
|
|Ross MacCallum 2,084
|
|Wayne Brown 594
|
|
||
|Hubert Seamans
|-
|bgcolor=whitesmoke|Albert
|
|Lee Martin 1,432
||
|Beverly M. Brine 2,328
|
|Wayne Steeves 1,641
|
|Elizabeth Venart 277
|
|
||
|Harold Terris†
|}

References

Further reading
 

1991 elections in Canada
Elections in New Brunswick
1991 in New Brunswick
September 1991 events in Canada